is a retired Japanese female volleyball player.

She was part of the Japan women's national volleyball team at the 1998 FIVB Volleyball Women's World Championship in Japan. and in the 2002 FIVB Volleyball Women's World Championship.

References

External links
http://www.denverpioneers.com/sports/w-volley/spec-rel/050800aaa.html
http://www.fivb.org/vis_web/volley/wwch2002/pdf/match013.pdf
http://fivb.com/vis_web/volley/wwch2002/pdf/match025.pdf

1972 births
Living people
Japanese women's volleyball players
Place of birth missing (living people)
Asian Games medalists in volleyball
Volleyball players at the 1998 Asian Games
Volleyball players at the 2002 Asian Games
Medalists at the 1998 Asian Games
Medalists at the 2002 Asian Games
Asian Games bronze medalists for Japan